Novaci is a town in Gorj County, Oltenia, Romania, situated at the foothills of the Parâng Mountains, on the river Gilort. It administers four villages: Bercești, Hirișești, Pociovaliștea, and Sitești.

The river traditionally divided the Oltenian settlement of Novacii Români from Novacii Străini, populated mainly by shepherds coming from over the mountains, from Sibiu County in Transylvania. The differences between the two segments of the town are obvious in the traditional vernacular architecture: the low fences of Oltenia are replaced by tall gates and hidden-away courtyards in the Novacii Străini.

The population has been steadily decreasing since the 1990s, mainly because of the migration of the young, educated inhabitants to bigger cities.

Only 12 kilometres from Novaci, passing the Transalpina (DN67C) road is Rânca (1600m altitude), the newly developed Romanian resort surrounded by mountain peaks and tremendous beauty. From this place is a view of the Parângu Mare peak and when the weather is good you can see the Peleaga peak of Retezat Mountains. During winter there are two ski slopes with low and medium difficulty.

References

Populated places in Gorj County
Localities in Oltenia
Towns in Romania